Marijke Groenewoud (born 28 January 1999) is a Dutch long-distance long-track speed skater and inline speed skater. She was part of Team FrySk and of marathon team Royal A-ware. As of 2020 she is part of Team Zaanlander, trained by Jillert Anema.

Career
Groenewoud is a marathon speed skater, winning the 2019–20 national marathon competition. 

In long-track speed skating she made her international World Cup speed skating debut during the 2019–20 ISU Speed Skating World Cup in Nagano, Japan, on 13 December 2019 in the mass start. She was also selected for 2020–21 ISU Speed Skating World Cup.

At the Dutch Single Distance Championships she won the silver medal at the 2019 KNSB Dutch Single Distance Championships and 2020 KNSB Dutch Single Distance Championships in the mass start event.

Records

Personal records

Tournament overview

Source:

World Cup overview

Source:
 DNQ = Did not qualify
 DQ = Disqualified
 – = Did not participate
(b) = Division B
 SF  = Semi-Final

References

External links

1999 births
People from Noardeast-Fryslân
Dutch female speed skaters
Inline speed skaters
Living people
World Single Distances Speed Skating Championships medalists
Olympic speed skaters of the Netherlands
Speed skaters at the 2022 Winter Olympics
Medalists at the 2022 Winter Olympics
Olympic medalists in speed skating
Olympic bronze medalists for the Netherlands
Sportspeople from Friesland
21st-century Dutch women